Molineria latifolia, also known as tambaka, lamba and lemba babi, is a species of flowering plant, a stemless perennial herb in the Hypoxidaceae family, that is native to Southeast Asia and produces edible fruits.

Description
The plant grows as a clump of 7–10 erect leaves, up to 1 m high in open areas and 2 m in forest shade. The leaves are 60–150 cm long by 8–25 cm wide. The inflorescences grow from the base of the leaves up 10 cm in height, forming compact 8 cm panicles of green bracts and yellow flowers. The fruits are oval berries, 2–3 cm by 1.2–1.7 cm in diameter, ripening white tinged pink, enclosing small black seeds in edible white pulp, with a taste similar to that of dragon fruit.

Distribution and habitat
The species is found throughout Malesia in lowland and hill mixed dipterocarp, lower montane and heath forests, as well as in secondary forest and areas of disturbed vegetation where it is common around villages.

References

latifolia
Flora of Malesia
Fruits originating in Asia
Plants described in 1811
Taxa named by William Townsend Aiton